Thomas Gibson (1750 – May 13, 1814) was an American Revolutionary War soldier who became the first Auditor of the U.S. State of Ohio.

Gibson was born in Virginia, and fought in the American Revolutionary War. He moved to the Northwest Territory, where he was auditor of the Territory.

Ohio became a state in March, 1803. The Ohio General Assembly met in joint session, and elected Gibson as the first Ohio State Auditor on March 15, 1803. He served a three-year term, and was re-elected by the legislature on January 20, 1806. Gibson served until resigning March 1, 1808.

Gibson was a Freemason. He was an early member of the Nova Caesaree Lodge No. 10, Cincinnati, Ohio, and the first master of the Scioto Lodge No. 2, Chillicothe, Ohio, from 1805 to 1807. He was exalted in Cincinnati Chapter No. 2, R.A.M., December 11, 1799. He died May 3, 1814.

Notes

References

 

1750 births
1814 deaths
Politicians from Cincinnati
Politicians from Chillicothe, Ohio
Virginia colonial people
State Auditors of Ohio
People of Virginia in the American Revolution
Ohio Democratic-Republicans